Peter Krukenberg (14 February 1787 – 13 December 1865) was a German pathologist who was a native of Königslutter. He was son-in-law to anatomist Johann Christian Reil (1759–1813), and grandfather to pathologist Friedrich Ernst Krukenberg (1871-1946) and surgeon Hermann Krukenberg (1863-1935).

He studied at the Collegium Carolinum in Braunschweig and at the Universities of Göttingen and Berlin. In 1814 he became an associate professor of pathology and therapy at the University of Halle, and from 1822 to 1856 was a full professor of pathology and director of the university clinic. In 1816 Krukenberg founded an ambulatory clinic at Halle. Two of his better known assistants were dermatologist Friedrich Wilhelm Felix von Bärensprung (1822-1864) and ophthalmologist Karl Ernst Theodor Schweigger (1830-1905).

Krukenberg was a pioneer of scientific knowledge-based medicine, and was considered one of the leading clinicians of his era. He was responsible for integrating clinical training into the fields of surgery, gynecology, psychiatry, et al., and is credited for helping to establish the University of Halle as a primary center of medical learning in 19th-century Germany.

In 1840, he was elected a foreign member of the Royal Swedish Academy of Sciences. He was author of "Jahrbücher der ambulatorischen Klinik in Halle" (Yearbook of the ambulatory clinic at Halle; 1820–24, 2 volumes).

External links
 The large microscope formerly owned and used by Peter Krukenberg

References
 Catalogus professorum halensis (biography of Peter Krukenberg translated from German)

 (full text online)

German pathologists
Academic staff of the University of Halle
People from Helmstedt (district)
Members of the Royal Swedish Academy of Sciences
University of Göttingen alumni
Humboldt University of Berlin alumni
Technical University of Braunschweig alumni
1787 births
1865 deaths